Where I Am King is a 2014 Philippine comedy film directed by Carlos Siguion-Reyna. It was selected to be screened in the Contemporary World Cinema section at the 2014 Toronto International Film Festival.

Cast
 Robert Arevalo
 Liza Lorena
 Rez Cortez
 Aiza Seguerra
 Cris Villonco
 Ciara Sotto
 Rafa Siguion-Reyna
 Eric Quizon
 Ali Sotto
 Audie Gemora

References

External links
 

2014 films
2014 comedy films
Philippine comedy films
2010s Tagalog-language films
Films directed by Carlos Siguion-Reyna